The 1943 season was Wisła Krakóws 35th year as a club.

Friendlies

Okupacyjne Mistrzostwa Krakowa

External links
1943 Wisła Kraków season at historiawisly.pl

Wisła Kraków seasons
Association football clubs 1943 season
Wisla